Oybek Omilovich Kasimov (Uzbek Latin: Oybek Omilovich Kasimov, Uzbek Cyrillic: :ru:Касимов, Ойбек Омилович, 26 August 1980) is currently the Secretary General of the National Olympic Committee of the Republic of Uzbekistan.

Biography 
 1999-2006 — Legal Counsel of the State Joint Stock Company "Uzprommashimpex" of the Ministry of Foreign Economic Relations of the Republic of Uzbekistan
 2006-2010 — First deputy general director and then the general director of the Pakhtakor Tashkent FK
 2010-2012 — First Vice-President of the Tashkent City Football Federation
 2012-2018 — Secretary General of the National Olympic Committee of the Republic of Uzbekistan
 2018-2020 — First Deputy Minister of Physical Culture and Sports of the Republic of Uzbekistan
 2020 — Secretary General of the National Olympic Committee of the Republic of Uzbekistan

Family

Children 
 Shakhrizoda Omilkhonova  June 18, 2008
 Firdavs Omilkhonov  September 23, 2009
 Shakhzoda Omilkhonova 25 September 25, 2013

External links
Oybek Kasimov Instagram
 Oybek Kasimov Facebook 
 Oybek Kasimov Twitter

References

1980 births
Sportspeople from Tashkent
Living people